Preston Airport  was an airport serving Guatemala, a village of the municipality of Mayarí in the Holguín Province of Cuba.

References

Defunct airports
Airports in Cuba
Buildings and structures in Holguín Province
Mayarí